Worcester Regional Transit Authority (WRTA) is a public, non-profit organization charged with providing public transportation to the city of Worcester, Massachusetts and the surrounding towns. The WRTA was created in September 1974 under Chapter 161B of the Massachusetts General Laws. This act also created several other regional transit authorities in Massachusetts, including the Greater Attleboro-Taunton Regional Transit Authority and the Pioneer Valley Transit Authority among others; in terms of ridership, the WRTA is the second largest regional transit authority and third largest transit system in Massachusetts.

Routes 
The WRTA currently provides fixed route bus service to  Worcester, and the surrounding towns of Auburn, Brookfield, East Brookfield, Leicester, Millbury, Oxford, Shrewsbury, Southbridge, Spencer, Webster, West Boylston. In addition to its fixed route bus service, the WRTA provides Community Shuttle Flex Van Service (limited shuttle service) to Grafton, Northbridge, and Westborough. The WRTA also provides paratransit service to a total of 37 communities in Central Massachusetts.

The WRTA's Operations and Maintenance Center is located at 42 Quinsigamond Ave in Worcester's Green Island Neighborhood. This new garage replaces the old one, meant to be a trolley yard, holding just 1/2 of the new capacity. The WRTA's previous facility is now home to a shopping center.

Fixed Route Bus Service

Community Shuttle Flex Van Service

Fleet
The Worcester Regional Transit Authority operates a fleet of 46 Gillig Low Floor buses, 6 Proterra EcoRide battery electric buses, and 35 Ford E350 minibuses.

References

External links
 WRTA official website

Bus transportation in Massachusetts
Transportation in Worcester, Massachusetts